A harmonic tremor is a sustained release of seismic and infrasonic energy typically associated with the underground movement of magma, the venting of volcanic gases from magma, or both. It is a long-duration release of seismic energy, with distinct spectral lines, that often precedes or accompanies a volcanic eruption. More generally, a volcanic tremor is a sustained signal that may or may not possess these harmonic spectral features. Being a long-duration continuous signal from a temporally extended source, a volcanic tremor contrasts distinctly with transient sources of seismic radiation, such as tremors that are typically associated with earthquakes and explosions.

The relation between long-period events and an imminent eruption was first observed by Bernard Chouet, a volcanologist who was working at the United States Geological Survey.

See also
Volcano tectonic earthquake

Notes

External links
Seismicity, low frequency events and tremor at the Katla subglacial volcano, Iceland
The harmonic tremors of a volcanic eruption 

Seismology
Volcanology
Volcanic earthquakes